The mainly ice-covered Prehn Peninsula is  long and  wide, between Hansen and Gardner Inlets, on the eastern coast and at the base of Antarctic Peninsula. First observed from aircraft by the RARE, 1947–48. Mapped by USGS from surveys and US Navy air photos, 1961–67. Named by US-ACAN for Lt. Cdr. Frederick A. Prehn, Jr., USN, pilot on photographic flights in the Pensacola Mountains and Alexander Island areas on Operation Deep Freeze 1967 and 1968.

See also
Lamboley Peak

References

Peninsulas of Palmer Land